Supernumerary actors are usually amateur character actors in opera and ballet performances who train under professional direction to create a believable scene.

Definition 

The term's original use, from the Latin supernumerarius, meant someone paid to appear on stage in crowd scenes or in the case of opera as non-singing small parts. The word can still be found used for such in theatre and opera. It is the equivalent of "extra" in the motion picture industry. Any established opera company will have a supernumerary core of artists to enhance the opera experience. The Metropolitan Opera (Met) in New York and the Washington National Opera are known for their high profile and seasoned supernumeraries.

The WNO has had some major supernumerary personalities on stage such as U.S. Supreme Court Justices Ginsburg and Kennedy.

Typical supernumerary work 
Supernumeraries are usually amateur character artists who train under professional direction to create a believable scene. They almost become part of the props and give a sense of credibility to scenes where crowds, court assistants, lackeys, peasants or a variety of period characters are needed. Some operas require over 50 supernumeraries. Work is assigned according to the ability to deliver an  understated performance that doesn't "steal focus from the main actors" but it is still vibrant and effusive.

Notes

References
The New Grove Dictionary of Opera; edited by Stanley Sadie (1992), 5,448 pages, is the best, and by far the largest, general reference for opera in the English language.  and  
The Viking Opera Guide (1994), 1,328 pages,  
Opera, the Rough Guide; by Matthew Boyden et al. (1997), 672 pages,  
Opera: A Concise History; by Leslie Orrey and Rodney Milnes. (World of Art.) London: Thames & Hudson 

Acting
Stage terminology